The Sorcerer's Apprentice is an original novel written by Christopher Bulis and based on the long-running British science fiction television series Doctor Who. It features the First Doctor, Susan, Ian and Barbara.

Plot
Elbyon is an incredible world of fantasy and magic: here, elves and dwarves live in harmony with man, wizards casts powerful spells, and knights slay dragons. Yet for all that, it seems Elbyon has secrets of its own: The TARDIS crew discover a relic from the 13th century in the woods, and become embroiled in the sinister machinations that threaten both the peace of the land, as well as the fate of the entire galaxy.

References

External links
The Cloister Library - The Sorcerer's Apprentice

1995 British novels
1995 science fiction novels
Virgin Missing Adventures
First Doctor novels
Novels by Christopher Bulis
Fiction set in the 30th century